Acushnet Airport was an airfield operational in the mid-20th century in Acushnet, Massachusetts.

References

Acushnet, Massachusetts
Defunct airports in Massachusetts
Airports in Bristol County, Massachusetts